Dimitri Deruelle (born 5 December 1971) is a French yacht racer who competed in the 1992 Summer Olympics and in the 2000 Summer Olympics.

References

1971 births
Living people
French male sailors (sport)
Olympic sailors of France
Sailors at the 1992 Summer Olympics – 470
Sailors at the 2000 Summer Olympics – 49er